Z20 could refer to:

 Colt Plus Z20, an automobile model
 DiMAGE Z20, a camera model
 German destroyer Z20 Karl Galster, a German destroyer
 Harbin Z-20, a class of Chinese helicopter
 New South Wales Z20 class locomotive, a class of Australian steam locomotives
 Nissan Z20S, an automobile engine model
 Z20 series, an automobile model
 Nubia Z20, a mobile phone